Two 1885 by-elections were held in the electorate of  to replace the sitting member in 1885, during the term of the 9th Parliament.

William Kelly stood and came second in both by-elections.

May 1885 by-election
The first by–election was held on 22 May after the resignation of George Morris when he was appointed the Legislative Council, and was won by John Sheehan. After Kelly asked for a scrutiny of the votes, Sheehan's majority was reduced from 15 to 12.

July 1885 by-election
The second by–election was held on 11 July after the death of John Sheehan on 12 June, Lawrence Grace won the seat.

References

Tauranga
Tauranga 1885
Politics of the Bay of Plenty Region
May 1885 events
July 1885 events